Leigh Creek may refer to:

Places
 Leigh Creek, South Australia, an outback town
Leigh Creek Coalfield discovered in 1888 and the site of a small underground mine
 Telford Cut, the open-cut coal mine operating from 1943 to 2015 
 Leigh Creek Airport
 Leigh Creek, Victoria, a town in Central Victoria east of Ballarat

Other uses
 Leigh Creek Energy, listed on the Australian Securities Exchange as LCK